David Yacovone is an American politician who has served in the Vermont House of Representatives since 2017.

References

Living people
Johnson State College alumni
21st-century American politicians
Democratic Party members of the Vermont House of Representatives
Year of birth missing (living people)